Gebke may refer to following rivers of North Rhine-Westphalia, Germany:

 Gebke (Meschede), right tributary of the Ruhr in Meschede
 Gebke (Wennemen), right tributary of the Ruhr in Wennemen
 Kleine Gebke, right tributary of the Ruhr in Meschede